Agnes Sligh Turnbull (October 14, 1888, New Alexandria, Pennsylvania  – January 31, 1982, Livingston, New Jersey) was a bestselling American writer, most noted for her works of historical fiction based in her native Western Pennsylvania.

Biography
Her parents were Alexander Halliday Sligh, an immigrant from Scotland, and Lucinda Hannah McConnell, also of Scottish descent. She attended the village school, and went on to boarding school before enrolling at the Teachers College at what is now called Indiana University of Pennsylvania, from which she graduated Phi Beta Kappa. She also attended the University of Chicago before starting her career as a high school English teacher.

In 1918, she married James Lyall Turnbull, just before his departure for Europe during World War I. He returned, and they were married for 40 years and had one child, a daughter named Martha. The family moved to Maplewood, New Jersey in 1922, where she lived for the rest of her life.

Turnbull had her first short story published by The American Magazine in 1920, and published further short stories regularly until 1936, when she published her first novel, The Rolling Years. While some critics regarded the morality of her writing as old-fashioned, she and others attributed it to a hopeful outlook on life.

She is buried in New Alexandria, Pennsylvania.

Works

Novelettes
In The Garden. New York: Fleming H. Revell, 1926
The Wife of Pontius Pilate. New York: Fleming H. Revell, 1928
The Colt That Carried A King. New York: Fleming H. Revell, 1933
Once To Shout. New York: Macmillan, 1943
Little Christmas. Boston: Houghton Mifflin, 1964

Novels
The Rolling Years. New York: Macmillan, 1936.
Remember the End. New York: Macmillan, 1938.
The Day Must Dawn. New York: Macmillan, 1942.
The Bishop's Mantle. New York: Macmillan, 1947.
The Gown of Glory. Boston: Houghton Mifflin, 1952.
The Golden Journey. Boston: Houghton Mifflin, 1955.
The Nightingale. Boston: Houghton Mifflin, 1960.
The King's Orchard. Boston: Houghton Mifflin, 1963
The Wedding Bargain. Boston: Houghton Mifflin, 1966
Many A Green Isle. Boston: Houghton Mifflin, 1968
The Flowering. Boston: Houghton Mifflin, 1972.
The Richlands. Boston: Houghton Mifflin, 1974.
The Winds of Love. Boston: Houghton Mifflin, 1977.
The Two Bishops. Boston: Houghton Mifflin, 1980.

Collection of short stories
This Spring of Love. New York: Fleming H. Revell, 1924
Far Above Rubies. New York: Fleming H. Revell, 1926
The Four Marys. New York: Fleming H. Revell, 1932
Old Home Town. New York: Fleming H.Revell, 1933

Juvenile works
Elijah the Fish-bite. New York: Macmillan, 1940.
Jed, the Shepherd's Dog. Boston: Houghton Mifflin, 1957.
George. Boston: Houghton Mifflin, 1964.
The White Lark. Boston: Houghton Mifflin, 1968.

Memoir

Dear Me: Leaves from the Diary of Agnes Sligh Turnbull. New York: Macmillan, 1941.
Out Of My Heart. Boston: Houghton Mifflin, 1958

References

Sources
 Alan Jalowitz's biographical sketch of Agnes Turnbull at Pennsylvania Center of the Book
 Edward K. Halula, Seaside, Oregon 97138
 Halula, Edward K., "Old Home Town", The Sentinel, October 2002.
 Halula, Edward K., "A Nightingale Sang: A Story About Agnes Sligh Turnbull",The Sentinel, Feb. 2003.       
 Halula, Edward K., "Two 'Girls' From New Alex", The Sentinel, June 2003.

American women writers
1888 births
1982 deaths
American people of Scottish descent
People from Maplewood, New Jersey
People from Westmoreland County, Pennsylvania
Indiana University of Pennsylvania alumni
University of Chicago alumni